Wubbo de Boer (born 27 May 1948, Amsterdam, died 20 April 2017) was a Dutch civil servant.

He has held several posts as Director General of Civil Aviation, and of Transport Policy in the Dutch Ministry of Transport. He was also Director General of Competition policy and also for Service Industry and Consumer Protection, as well as for Small and Medium Sized Enterprises in the Dutch Ministry of Economic Affairs. He has also been president from 2000 to 2010 of the Office for Harmonization in the Internal Market (OHIM), the European Union body in charge of trademarks and designs and based in Alicante, Spain.

He was educated at the University of Amsterdam (1966–1971).

References

Further reading
OHIM: Leading OHIM into the 21st century, Managing Intellectual Property, Supplement – Spain and OHIM Guide, September 2003

1948 births
2017 deaths
Dutch civil servants
University of Amsterdam alumni
People from Amsterdam